William Reinhold "Gatz" Hjortsberg (February 23, 1941 – April 22, 2017) was an American novelist and screenwriter, known for his originality and for writing the screenplay of the film Legend.

His novel Falling Angel was the basis for the film Angel Heart (1987). The novel was adapted into an opera in 2015, composed by J. Mark Scearce with a libretto by Lucy Thurber.

His 2015 novel Mañana is a thriller set in Mexico.

Hjortsberg the only child of a Swedish restaurateur father and a Swiss mother. He attended Dartmouth College, the Yale School of Drama (where he met Thomas McGuane), and was a Stegner Fellow at Stanford University. He was married three times, and had a son and a daughter. He died of pancreatic cancer.

Novels
Alp (1969)
Gray Matters (1971)
Symbiography (1973)
Toro! Toro! Toro! (1974)
Falling Angel (1978)
Tales & Fables (1985), published by Sylvester & Orphanos
Nevermore (1994)
Mañana (2015)
Angel's Inferno (2020)

Screenplays
Thunder and Lightning (1977)
The Georgia Peaches (1980) (TV) 
Legend (1985)

Nonfiction
  A biography of writer Richard Brautigan.

References

External links
William Hjortsberg official website

1941 births
2017 deaths
20th-century American novelists
American horror writers
American male novelists
American mystery writers
American science fiction writers
American male screenwriters
Writers from New York City
20th-century American male writers
Novelists from New York (state)
Screenwriters from New York (state)
Deaths from pancreatic cancer
Deaths from cancer in Montana